Varud halt is a former stopping-place on the Hovedbane (Norwegian Trunk Railway), located 59.54 km from Oslo S station near the village of Råholt in Eidsvoll Municipality. No trains have stopped at Varud since 13 June 2004.

Railway stations on the Trunk Line
Railway stations in Eidsvoll
Railway stations opened in 1953
Railway stations closed in 2004
1953 establishments in Norway